Lobesia drasteria is a species of moth of the family Tortricidae first described by Józef Razowski in 2013. It is found on Seram Island in Indonesia. The habitat consists of lower montane forests.

The wingspan is about 16 mm. The forewings are reddish rust, but darker posteriorly and the base of the wing is blackish, sprinkled with white. There are some white costal strigulae (fine streaks). The hindwings are whitish, sprinkled with dark brown and dark brown postmedially. The costa is whitish.

Etymology
The specific name refers to the colouration of the forewings and is derived from Greek drasterios (meaning drastic, enterprising).

References

Moths described in 2013
Olethreutini